Salvatore Dario La Vardera (born 7 March 2002) is an Italian professional footballer who plays as a left back for  club Cosenza.

Club career
Born in Palermo, La Vardera wa promoted to Cosenza first team for the 2020–21 Serie B season. On 30 September 2020, he made his debut for Coppa Italia against Alessandria. He made his Serie B debut on 22 August 2021 against Ascoli as a late substitute.

On 31 August 2021, he was loaned to Imolese, on Serie C.

References

External links
 
 

2002 births
Living people
Footballers from Palermo
Italian footballers
Association football fullbacks
Serie B players
Serie C players
Serie D players
Palermo F.C. players
Cosenza Calcio players
S.S.D. Acireale Calcio 1946 players
Imolese Calcio 1919 players